Sau Saal Baad is a 1966 Hindi film directed by B.K. Dubey starring Feroz Khan. The film was released on 29 December 1966 and was certified U by the Central Board of Film Certification.

Plot
While working at an excavation site, a young engineer (Feroz Khan) notices an abandoned mansion where he hears a female voice singing a tragic song. When he investigates, he finds a beautiful apparition; what's more, there seems to be something quite familiar about her. Could this be the ghost of someone from his past life?

Cast
The cast is listed below:
Feroz Khan		
Manmohan Krishna
Kumkum
Rajendra Nath
D.K. Sapru

Soundtrack
The soundtrack was composed by Laxmikant–Pyarelal. According to the author Ganesh Anantharaman, the first song, "Ek Ritu Aae Ek Ritu Jaae", is one of their "most tuneful numbers". Raju Bharatan of The Illustrated Weekly of India described "Ye Raat Bhi Jaa Rahi Hai" as an "unusual composition".

Reception
Shankar's Weekly wrote in a scathing review of the film that its story is "as confusing as much to the hero as to the audience" and took note of some "awful comedy" in it.

References

External links
 

1966 films
1960s Hindi-language films
Films scored by Laxmikant–Pyarelal